DGCA may refer to:

 DGCA (computing), file compression utility (also the name of its file format)
 Directorate General of Civil Aviation (Albania), now called the Albanian Civil Aviation Authority
 Directorate General of Civil Aviation (Bolivia)
 Directorate General for Civil Aviation (Croatia)
 Directorate General for Civil Aviation (France)
 Directorate General of Civil Aviation (India)
 Directorate General of Civil Aviation (Indonesia)
 Directorate General of Civil Aviation (Turkey)